In Brisbane Today was an early Australian television series, which aired in 1990 until 1992, on the Nine Network in Queensland only. It was hosted by Fiona McDonald.

Nine Network original programming
Australian non-fiction television series
1990 Australian television series debuts
1992 Australian television series endings